Hou Yibo (born 23 July 1991) is a Chinese team handball goalkeeper. She plays for the club Beijing HC, and on the Chinese national team. She represented China at the 2013 World Women's Handball Championship in Serbia, where the Chinese team placed 18th.

References

Chinese female handball players
1991 births
Living people
Handball players at the 2014 Asian Games
Asian Games competitors for China
21st-century Chinese women